FastTrack Schedule is a proprietary project management software tool developed by AEC Software. It was first released in 1987 for Microsoft Windows and Mac OS X, and is used for planning, tracking, and reporting project goals.

The developers of the tool, AEC Software, Inc., is a company located in the Dulles Technology Corridor of Northern Virginia.

Overview 
FastTrack Schedule allows users to organise tasks into project plans, assign resources to tasks, use effort driven scheduling, and view project details in many forms, such as Gantt charts, monthly calendars, and resource histograms.

The tool's capabilities are suited for project management beginners as well as experienced project managers working in small to mid-sized project teams. Versions are available for Microsoft Windows and Mac OS X and files are cross-platform compatible, enabling team members on PCs and Macs to collaborate on projects.

FastTrack Schedule also exchanges data with spreadsheets (including Microsoft Excel), databases, organizers such as Microsoft Outlook and Apple's iCal, Mindjet's MindManager mind mapping software, and other project management software, including Microsoft Project.

It has a global customer base and has been localised into six languages (English, Japanese, French, German, Spanish, and Italian). Some of their high profile users include: NASA, Nike, Amazon.com, Honda, Pixar, MIT Lincoln Laboratory, and The Olympic Games.

On 5 September 2012, FastTrack Schedule Go for the iPad was released. A productivity app sold on Apple iTunes, it allows the user to analyze, present, and take their schedule with them. It works with FastTrack Schedule Mac/Win files, XML, and Microsoft Project files.

Some Features
Intuitive Interface
The Mac product has a Format Bar that was modelled after the iWork suite, while the Windows product uses the Ribbon. The Format Bar and Ribbon are both context-sensitive and contain key scheduling tools. In addition, they can be customized by dragging and dropping features you use the most.

Base and Work Calendars
Choose Base Calendars such as standard, 24 hour, and night shift calendars, or customize your own. These calendars can be defined per task, so projects can have an unlimited number of Work Calendars.

Effort-Driven Scheduling
For tasks that can be completed faster by adding more resources, use Effort-Driven Scheduling for simple schedule compression. Automatically adjust task durations as resources are added or subtracted, while keeping the total work for a task constant.

Image Columns
Use Image Columns to add pictures of task items, staff, resources, designs, progress photos, etc, directly into column cells. Images automatically scale as thumbnails to match row heights and display as larger images when you hover over them.

Assignment Contouring
Choose from eight built-in work contours or customize your own for the ultimate ease and flexibility in resource scheduling. Assignment contouring enables you to quickly re-distribute your resources' efforts on a task for those special cases and must-meet deadlines.

Work Usage Inspector
Monitor resource workloads while making assignments in the Schedule View. The Work Usage Inspector displays Resource Usage Graphs at the base of the Gantt chart to provide a detailed snapshot of a resource's free and busy time, enabling you to make precise assignments and effectively manage resource costs.

Address Book Integration & Resource Information Form
Add address book contacts – including their photo and contact details – directly into your projects. The Resource Information Form organizes work schedules, rates, and all contact information into a single comprehensive form.

iMedia Browser
Use the iMedia Browser to add photos, logos, sketches, and other images to your schedule.

Etc.
Resource Management: Collect, organize, and track a resource's Details, Skill Sets, Materials/Supplies, Costs, Groups, by creating from scratch or importation.
Collaboration: Work with others using Team Calendars, Timeline, Issue Tracking, Email Integration, and Dashboard.
Project Management: Includes tools for Task Management, Mind Maps, Task Feedback, Scheduling, Calendars, Timelines, Gantt Charts, Interactive Gantt Charts, Reporting, Statistics, Work Load, Financials, Document Management, Privacy Settings, Budgeting, Critical Path Method, Project Templates, Baseline, Custom Baseline, Milestones. 
Help & Support: A robust and highly praised support system is provided. It includes: Training Courses, FAQ's, Tutorials, User Manual, Email Support, Online Form Support, Telephone Support, and an online forum.

See also
Project management software
Comparison of project management software

References

External links
Official web site
Official Facebook page
Official FastTrack Schedule Quick Tour
FastTrack Schedule Reviews and Awards

Project management software
Business software
Business software for macOS
Business software for Windows